Rolf-Erik Nystrøm (born 23 April 1975) is a Norwegian saxophonist and composer in the field of contemporary music.

Career 
Nystrøm has a diploma of music from the Norwegian Academy of Music and is now a lecturer in the art of improvisation based contemporary music.

He has been soloist with the Norwegian Symphony Orchestra and the Basel Symphony Orchestra and the Swedish Radio Symphony Orchestra. He has been with the bands like Poing, Dozo, Hero og Zanussi five and participated in about 50 recordings in various musical genres.

In 1994 he went to the finals of the Norwegian TV show Talentiaden and in 1998 he was soloist with Bergen Philharmonic Orchestra in the Saxophne conserto by Bjørn Kruse.

In 2006 he released his first solo album, Concepts of Sorrow & Dangers on the record company Aurora. The album was nominated for the 2006 Spellemannprisen class contemporary music.  As a composer, he has written music for stage, television documentaries and chamber.

In 2013 he wrote and performed music along with the Munor ensemble to the 1911 Italian film L'Inferno at Tysværtunet social center at "Tysvær skrekkfest" (Tysvær horrorfilmfestival).

Honors 
2001: Rikskonsertene's launch support
2005: Youth Lindemanpris
2006: Statens arbeidsstipend

Discography (in selection)

Solo albums 
2006: Concepts Of Sorrows & Dangers (Aurora Records)

Collaborations 
With Zanussi 5
2004: Zanussi Five (Moserobie Prod)
2007: Alborado (Moserobie Prod)
2010: Ghost Dance (Moserobie Prod)
2014: Live In Coimbra (Clean Feed)

Duo HERO with Helge Lien
2005: Prøysen – musikken fra dokumentaren (Jazzavdelingen) nominated for the Edvard Prize in 2005
2006: The Discovery & Exploration of Planet HERO (Jazzaway)

Paul Hindemith compositions performed by Henninge Landaas, Vegard Landaas, Elzbieta Nawrocka and Bjørg Lewis
2009: The Golden Hindemith: Chamber Music For VIola & Saxophone (Lawo Classics)

With Unni Løvlid and Becaye Aw
2009: Seven Winds (Heilo Music)

References

External links 
 

Norwegian jazz saxophonists
Norwegian composers
Norwegian male composers
Heilo Music artists
Norwegian Academy of Music alumni
20th-century Norwegian saxophonists
21st-century Norwegian saxophonists
Musicians from Oslo
1975 births
Living people
20th-century saxophonists
20th-century Norwegian male musicians
21st-century Norwegian male musicians
Male jazz musicians